Var B may refer to:
 B-type variable star
 Variable declaration of "b" in computer programming
 M33 Var B, see List of most luminous stars